Victoria & Albert is a 2001 British-American historical television serial. It focused on the early life and marriage of Queen Victoria and Prince Albert. The series starred Victoria Hamilton as Victoria, Jonathan Firth as Prince Albert and Peter Ustinov as King William IV. It was directed by John Erman.

In the UK it was broadcast by the BBC, split into two parts of 100 minutes each.  The series is now available on DVD.

Plot
The first episode covers Victoria's growth from bullied princess to ruling queen, and includes her romance and marriage with Albert of Saxe-Coburg-Gotha. The second episode depicts Victoria's life from her first pregnancy to Albert's death, including their family life together and Albert's increasing public role. Each episode is begun and ended by a small section with the 'Old Victoria', at the age of about 78.

Cast

 Victoria Hamilton as Queen Victoria
 Jonathan Firth as Prince Albert
 Peter Ustinov as King William IV
 Delena Kidd as Queen Adelaide
 Penelope Wilton as The Duchess of Kent
 Nigel Hawthorne as Lord Melbourne
 Diana Rigg as Baroness Lehzen
 John Wood as The Duke of Wellington
 David Suchet as Baron Stockmar
 Jonathan Cecil as Page
 Patrick Malahide as Sir John Conroy
 James Callis as Prince Ernest of Saxe-Coburg and Gotha
 Jonathan Pryce as King Leopold I of Belgium
 Crispin Redman as Mr. Anson
 Alec McCowen as Sir Robert Peel
 Michael Siberry as Henry Paget, Earl of Uxbridge
 Rachel Pickup as Henrietta (Hetty) Standish
 Crispin Bonham-Carter as Frederick Standish
 Simon Quarterman as Albert Edward, the Prince of Wales
 Richard Briers as Joseph Paxton
 Kate Maberly as Princess Alice
 Joyce Redman as aged Queen Victoria
 Zizi Strallen as Victoria, Princess Royal
 Billy Hicks as Prince Affie

References

External links
 

2001 American television series debuts
2001 American television series endings
2000s American drama television series
2000s American television miniseries
2001 British television series debuts
2001 British television series endings
2000s British drama television series
2000s British television miniseries
American biographical series
BBC television dramas
Cultural depictions of Edward VII
Cultural depictions of Queen Victoria on television
Television shows shot at Elstree Film Studios
Cultural depictions of Albert, Prince Consort
BBC television miniseries
English-language television shows
Television shows set in England
Television series set in the 1830s